Mission Sapne (English: Mission Dreams) is an Indian television reality show, the show is created by SBF. which airs on Colors TV every Sunday 11am. The first actor to appear on the show was Ranbir Kapoor. The first season ended on 27 April 2014.

Second season premiered on 17 January 2016 featuring Vidya Balan. The second season ended on 20 March 2016 with Alia Bhatt featuring in the final episode.

Synopsis
The show is about upbringing people who have struggled in their life but never left their spirit to achieve something. The show will help these people to achieve dreams which they've dreamed of. The show will financially help these people by inviting Celebrities who will do the same daily job which these people do like driving auto rickshaw or selling something. The amount which the celebrity will earn will be multiplied by 100.

Guests

References

External links

Mission Sapne 2

Colors TV original programming